Abu Ishaq al-Sahili (1290 – 15 October 1346), also known as al-Tuwayjin, was an Andalusian poet and fiqh scholar who became a favored member of the court of Mansa Musa, emperor of Mali. He is the most renowned of the scholars from the wider Muslim world who emigrated to Mali in the aftermath of Mansa Musa's pilgrimage.

Many European texts refer to al-Sahili as an architect, and attribute major innovations in West African architecture to him. However, his contributions to West African architecture were minimal. His one known architectural project was the construction of an audience chamber for Mansa Musa, to which his contributions may have been more organizational and artistic than architectural.

Name

His full name was Abū Isḥāq Ibrāhīm ibn Muḥammad ibn Ibrāhīm al-Sāḥilī al-Anṣārī al-Gharnāṭī. His nisba al-Sahili was inherited from his maternal grandfather and indicates he lived on the coast. His nisba al-Anṣārī (alternatively given as al-Awsī) indicates he claimed descent from the tribes who sheltered Muhammad in Medina, with the latter possibility specifically indicating he claimed descent from the two most powerful such tribes. The name al-Tuwayjin translates as "the small casserole".

Biography

Early life
Abu Ishaq al-Sahili was born in Granada during the late 13th century. His father, Muhammad, was trained in jurisprudence and was the head of the perfume guild of Granada.

In Granada, al-Sahili became a drafter of legal documents and did some work on legal problems. In this time, he became known as a poet and was described in laudatory terms by his contemporary Ibn al-Khatib.

A near-contemporary poet said that he once suffered from temporary madness while under the influence of marking nut and declared himself to be a prophet. Possibly as a result of this, or for some other reason, he became disgraced and left Granada. In approximately 1321, he departed al-Andalus and traveled to Egypt, Syria, Iraq, and Yemen before going on the hajj in 1324.

Court of Mansa Musa

While on the hajj in 1324, al-Sahili met Mansa Musa, the ruler of Mali. Al-Sahili traveled back to Mali with Mansa Musa, who enjoyed his conversation and gave him gifts. Musa may have found his eloquence and knowledge of Islamic jurisprudence appealing. Musa brought many scholars back to Mali with him, of which al-Sahili became the most famous.

Al-Sahili directed the construction of an audience chamber in the capital of Mali, for which Musa paid him 12,000 mithqals (51 kg) of gold. Al-Sahili's contribution may have been largely managerial, and the payment may have included the construction budget. However, al-Sahili's calligraphic skills were well-regarded, and he may have had a personal hand in decorating the building. On some occasion, possibly as part of the payment for the audience chamber, Musa gave al-Sahili 4,000 mithqals in a single day.

After traveling to Mali, al-Sahili settled in Timbuktu. When the Alexandrian merchant Siraj al-Din traveled to Mali in 1334 to collect a debt owed by Mansa Musa, al-Sahili hosted him in his home. Siraj al-Din died while a guest of al-Sahili; foul play was initially suspected, but Siraj al-Din's son attested that his father died of natural causes. Al-Sahili may have encouraged positive relations between Mali and the Marinid Sultanate, and at some point between 1331 and 1337, al-Sahili traveled to the Maghreb and exchanged gifts with the Marinid sultan Abu al-Hasan.  While in the Maghreb, al-Sahili considered returning to Grenada, but circumstances forced him to return to Mali. He was attacked by bandits en route, but eventually returned to Timbuktu.

Al-Sahili died on October 15, 1346, in Timbuktu, and was buried there. Though he probably never married, he was survived by several children, who settled in Walata. The traveler Ibn Battuta remarked on seeing his grave when he visited Timbuktu in 1353.

Contribution to West African architecture

Many modern sources refer to al-Sahili as an architect and credit many architectural works of West Africa to him, including the Djinguereber Mosque and a royal palace in Timbuktu and the mosque of Gao. The French colonial official and scholar Maurice Delafosse regarded al-Sahili as the creator of what he referred to as the Sudanese architectural style, which he regarded as having been based on Maghrebi architecture. However, there is very little support for a major role for al-Sahili in the architecture of Mali. The only architectural project he is known to have been involved in was the audience chamber in the city of Mali, and his contribution to the project may have been more organizational than architectural. Other structures that have been attributed to him have been attributed to him largely on the assumption that he was Musa's chief architect, which is not supported by the sources. West African architecture primarily arose due to a combination of indigenous development and gradual influence from North Africa.

Footnotes

References

Bibliography

1346 deaths
People from Timbuktu
Poets from al-Andalus
14th-century people from al-Andalus
People from the Province of Granada
14th-century Arabic poets
Scholars of the Nasrid period